OO is the second extended play by South Korean singer Zion.T. It was released by YG Entertainment subsidiary label The Black Label on February 1, 2017. The extended play features his collaboration with G-Dragon and Beenzino.

Background and release
On January 21, 2017, it was announced that Zion.T would release new music in early February, and that he had completed filming the music video for his new album's title single, which was directed by Han Sa-min. Two days later, they announced that the album was to release on February 1, and that G-Dragon would be featured in the album; it was the second collaboration between them, since 2013 when Zion.T featured on G-Dragon’s I Love It. Beenzino was later revealed to be featured in the album, with teasers of all the songs of the album. On January 27, a teaser video of the album was released, alongside the title track.

Reception
Billboard's Tamar Herman praised the album and the title single, "While maintaining his typical croons, Zion.T refreshed his sound on "Your Song" with the lively piano-based melody...the singer’s latest is a refreshing, poppish update to his sonic style. With snapping, playful strings and a rock-tinged chorus, "Your Song" is a tightly produced track that complements Zion.T’s lush vocals." The song "Complex" featuring G-Dragon was selected by Apple Music 'Best of the Week'.

Track listing

Weekly charts

Sales

Release history

References

External links 
 "노래(The Song)" music video

YG Entertainment EPs
Korean-language EPs
2017 EPs